Flor María Palomeque (born 6 August 1979) is an Ecuadorian actress, dancer, and model. She is married to actor Roberto Chávez and has three children.

Biography

Flor María Palomeque was born on 6 August 1979 in Guayaquil, Ecuador, the youngest of five children. She would be raised and complete her schooling there. In 1996, she began her career as a model and dancer, appearing on TC Televisión's A todo dar for a period of ten months when she was just 17, being known for her performance of La mosca. She and a large part of the cast of Ni en Vivo and Directo, notably Reinoso, joined with Ecuavisa for a new program, Vivos , which would run for seven years.

Palomeque also played in the 2011-12 comedy , a spoof of Leopoldo Fernández's La Tremenda Corte. The next year, she became the hostess of the comedy interview show No culpes a la Mofle, playing the titular La Mofle.

References

1979 births
Living people
Ecuadorian stage actresses
Ecuadorian telenovela actresses
Ecuadorian television actresses
20th-century Ecuadorian actresses
21st-century Ecuadorian actresses